IAHS may refer to:
 International Association of Hydrological Sciences
 International Academy of the History of Science
 Itawamba Agricultural High School